Elections to Stockport Metropolitan Borough Council were held on 7 May 1998.  One third of the council was up for election and the council stayed under no overall control.

After the election, the composition of the council was
Liberal Democrat 30
Labour 27
Conservative 3
Ratepayers 3

Election result

References

1998 English local elections
1998
1990s in Greater Manchester